Carl Lindquist (born June 17, 1988) is a Swedish actor and singer. He appeared as Raoul in the Norwegian premiere of Andrew Lloyd Webber's The Phantom of the Opera at the Folketeateret in Oslo in 2018–2019. In 2016 he appeared as Peter in the European Tour of Bill Kenwright’s official production of Jesus Christ Superstar as well as playing leading man "Fred Gaily" in a UK Tour of Miracle on 34th Street (known as Here's Love) in 2015. He has also appeared on stage with Ramin Karimloo.

In 2020 he was the voice-over for the Swedish travel agency VING's commercials, broadcast on Swedish national television and online.

Carl is also a singer-songwriter and he released his debut solo EP, 'End of Our Road' in 2012.

Theatre credits

Filmography

Video games

Discography

Solo 
 End of Our Road (EP) (2012)

With Coexistence
 Carrion Comfort (EP) (2009)
 Flow (2012)
 Everlasting Scars (2016)

With Anton Johansson's Galahad Suite
 Anton Johansson's Galahad Suite (2013)

Awards and nominations

References

External links
 Official Website
 Carl Lindquist on Twitter
 Carl Lindquist on IMDb

1988 births
21st-century Swedish male actors
Male actors from Stockholm
Male musical theatre actors
Swedish male musical theatre actors
Swedish male stage actors
Swedish male film actors
Swedish male television actors
Swedish male singers
Living people
English-language singers from Sweden
Swedish-language singers